Pseudocolopteryx is a genus of bird in the family Tyrannidae. They are found in marshy habitats in South America. All have yellow underparts.

Species
The genus contains five species:

References

 
Bird genera
Taxonomy articles created by Polbot